The Snoqualmie Falls Hydroelectric Plant is located just north of Snoqualmie in King County, Washington state, US. Located just below the Snoqualmie Falls, the power plant consists of two power houses, Plant 1 and Plant 2. Plant 1 was completed in 1899 and is located underground. It is the first completely underground hydroelectric power plant ever built in the world. Plant 2 was built in 1910 and is located along the right bank of the Snoqualmie River. Both plants receive water from a small reservoir created by a weir atop the falls. Plant 1 has an installed capacity of 13.7 MW and Plant 2 a capacity of 40.2 MW for a total installed capacity of 53.9 MW, enough to power 40,000 homes.

Plant 1 was added to the National Register of Historic Places as Snoqualmie Falls Cavity Generating Station on April 23, 1976. In 1981, Plant 1 was also designated as an National Historic Civil Engineering Landmark by the American Society of Civil Engineers. The power plant is owned by Puget Sound Energy. In 1992, Snoqualmie Falls Hydroelectric Power Plant Historic District was added to the National Register of Historic Places.

History

The power plant was envisioned by Charles H. Baker in the 1890s. Baker was an engineer for the Seattle, Lake Shore and Eastern Railway and would pass the Snoqualmie Falls routinely during his work. Similar to the Schoellkopf Power Station on Niagara Falls in New York, Baker wanted to exploit the drop in elevation of Snoqualmie Falls for hydroelectric power. After the Panic of 1893 he became unemployed and sought to build the power plant. With funding from his family, to include his father, wealthy businessman William T. Baker, he formed the Snoqualmie Falls Power Company and bought the falls and surrounding land in 1897. Construction on the plant began in 1898. First, a cofferdam was constructed to seal the river from the water intake on the left bank of the Snoqualmie Falls. Steam-powered pneumatic drills were then used to excavate a vertical shaft from the intake to the cavern for Plant 1. A horizontal tunnel was dug as well, which met the vertical shaft at the cavern for Plant 1. A weir was constructed downstream of the intake and just above the falls, to help raise the river above the intake so water could be delivered to the plant. Four Pelton turbines with 1.5 MW Westinghouse generators were initially installed. The first operational generator was online and began to transmit power to Seattle on July 31, 1899. The remainder were commissioned and delivering power to Tacoma as well on November 1, 1899. In 1903 Seattle Electric Company acquired Snoqualmie Falls Power Company. The death of William Baker and financial difficulties that same year ended Charles Baker's stake in the plant. A fifth turbine-generator, horizontal Francis-type, originally rated at 5 MW, was added to Plant 1 in 1905. In 1908 Seattle-Tacoma Power Company, a forerunner to Puget Sound Energy, purchased Seattle Electric Company.
 Penstock was supplied and installed by Chicago Bridge &a Iron Co. 
Soon after the fifth generator was added to Plant 1, plans for Plant 2 began. Engineer W.A. Brackenridge studied and designed the plant. It would include a tunnel from the weir connected to a forebay would supply water to the future Plant 2, located just downstream from the falls. Plant 2 was commissioned in 1910 with a single 9 MW Francis turbine-generator. To make future expansion possible, the tunnel and penstock were built large enough to supply up to three generators. Plant 2 underwent an expansion beginning in 1956. A second Francis turbine-generator was installed and commissioned in 1957. A larger second penstock was also installed as the new generator was much larger than earlier planned. At this time, the entire power plant had an installed capacity of 44.4 MW. The second turbine for Plant 2 was replaced in 1991 due to end-of-life and it was once again replaced in 2004 as it was damaged by sediment.

Rehabilitation and upgrade
In April 2010, Puget Sound Energy began a US$200 million project to rehabilitate and upgrade the power plant. The project included retrofitting the first four of the generators in Plant 1 and replacing the fifth. A turbine-generator would be replaced in Plant 2 as well. Lowering the weir will help reduce flood waters upstream of the falls. The penstocks, which feed the power plants with water, were to be upgraded as well. Finally, automatic shut-off and bypass valves were installed for Plant 2. The shut-off valves will better prepare the plant for emergencies and the bypass valves will allow water to flow downstream in the case that Plant 2 is offline. To promote tourism, recreation and culture, several upgrades to include new visitor centers, hiking trails, a boardwalk and improved landscaping were implemented. Renovations on Plant 2 were completed in April 2013. The new 6.5 MW Francis turbine generator in Plant 1 and the entire project was finished in mid-2014. The project raised the installed capacity of the power plant from 44.4 MW to 53.9 MW.

Design
To supply water to Plant 1 and 2, a weir with a height ranging  creates a small reservoir. The intake for Plant 1 is located just above the left abutment of the weir. It houses four 1.8 MW Pelton turbine-generators and one 6.5 MW Francis turbine-generator.

The intake for Plant 2 is located near the right abutment of the weir. Water first enters a tunnel along a ridge which parallels the river downstream of the falls. It reaches a forebay which temporarily stores water before it is sent to the plant. The penstocks connect to Plant 2 which is located on the right bank of the Snoqualmie River. It houses a 13.7 MW and a 26.5 MW Francis turbine-generator. Water discharged from Plant 2, at a rate of up , immediately enters the river.

References

External links

Snoqualmie Falls Hydroelectric Project at Puget Sound Energy
Snoqualmie Falls Hydroelectric Project at SnoqualmieFalls.com
Snoqualmie Falls Cavity Generating Station at the ASCE
1902 Scientific American

Dams in Washington (state)
Dams completed in 1899
Weirs
Hydroelectric power plants in Washington (state)
Energy infrastructure completed in 1899
Energy infrastructure completed in 1910
Dams on the National Register of Historic Places in Washington (state)
Historic American Engineering Record in Washington (state)
National Register of Historic Places in King County, Washington
1899 establishments in Washington (state)
1910 establishments in Washington (state)
Run-of-the-river power stations
Buildings and structures in King County, Washington
Historic Civil Engineering Landmarks
Underground power stations
Puget Sound Energy
Energy infrastructure on the National Register of Historic Places